Tokyo 2nd district was a constituency of the House of Representatives in the Imperial Diet of Japan (national legislature). Between 1928 and 1942 it elected five representatives by single non-transferable vote (SNTV). It was located in Tokyo Prefecture and consisted of Tokyo City's Kanda, Koishikawa, Hongō and Shitaya wards. It was most notably represented by Christian socialist leader Isoo Abe, between 1926 and 1931 chairman of the Socialist Mass Party (Shakai Minshūtō), and post-war prime minister Ichirō Hatoyama who founded the Liberal Party in 1945, the Japan Democratic Party in 1954 and chaired the Liberal Democratic Party after the "conservative merger" of the two parties in 1955.

After the 1946 redistricting the area became part of the limited voting 1st district that comprised the eastern half of the former city of Tokyo.

Elected representatives

References 

Districts of the House of Representatives (Japan)